Kammari (Blacksmith) is one of the five Vishwakarma communities.

See also
Vishvakarman
Pothuluru Veerabrahmendra
Brahma

References

Social groups of Andhra Pradesh
Social groups of Telangana